Jim J. Koetter (born c. 1938) is a former American football coach.  He served as the head coach of the Idaho State Bengals football team from 1983 to 1987.

Biography
A native of McCook, Nebraska, Koetter played college football at McCook Junior College (which later merged into Mid-Plains Community College), then transferred to Idaho State University (ISU) in Pocatello, Idaho, where he played as an end in 1958 and 1959, and earned a bachelor's degree in 1961.

Remaining in eastern Idaho, Koetter was the head coach at Aberdeen High School for two years before joining the coaching staff as an assistant  coach at Highland High School in Pocatello in 1963. Koetter was also an assistant basketball coach and track coach at Highland.

Koetter became an assistant at his alma mater ISU in 1980 under new head coach Dave Kragthorpe, and the next year the Bengals won the national title in Division I-AA.

After his tenure at ISU, Koetter returned to high school coaching at Pocatello High School.

Koetter is a 1985 inductee of the Idaho State athletic hall of fame, in both football and track and field. He is the father of Dirk Koetter, who has coached in the National Football League (NFL) including a tenure as head coach of the Tampa Bay Buccaneers.

Head coaching record

College

References

Year of birth missing (living people)
1930s births
Living people
American football ends
Idaho State Bengals football coaches
Idaho State Bengals football players
High school basketball coaches in Idaho
High school football coaches in Idaho
People from McCook, Nebraska
Coaches of American football from Nebraska
Players of American football from Nebraska